Bernard Genghini (born 18 January 1958) is a French former professional footballer who played as a midfielder.

International career 
Genghini earned 27 caps and scored six goals for the France national team. He played in three major international tournaments: the 1982 World Cup where he scored free kicks against Kuwait and Austria (fourth place), 1984 European Championships (champions, playing as a substitute in the final), and the 1986 World Cup (third place).

Personal life 
Bernard Genghini is of Italian descent and is the father of Benjamin Genghini, who is also a professional football player.

References

External links
 
 

1958 births
Living people
People from Soultz-Haut-Rhin
French people of Italian descent
Sportspeople from Haut-Rhin
French footballers
Footballers from Alsace
Association football midfielders
France international footballers
France youth international footballers
UEFA European Championship-winning players
1982 FIFA World Cup players
UEFA Euro 1984 players
1986 FIFA World Cup players
Ligue 1 players
Swiss Super League players
FC Sochaux-Montbéliard players
AS Saint-Étienne players
AS Monaco FC players
Servette FC players
Olympique de Marseille players
FC Girondins de Bordeaux players
French football managers
FC Mulhouse managers
French expatriate footballers
French expatriate sportspeople in Switzerland
Expatriate footballers in Switzerland